The Central District of Nazarabad County is in Nazarabad County, Alborz province, Iran. At the 2006 census, its population was 103,476 in 26,060 households, at which time the county was in Tehran province. The last census in 2016 counted 133,712 people in 40,857 households.

References 

Nazarabad County

Districts of Alborz Province

Populated places in Alborz Province

Populated places in Nazarabad County